Juan de Cárcer y Disdier (1892 in Málaga – October 1962 in Madrid) was a Spanish footballer who played as a goalkeeper and was also a referee, and manager. As a player, he represented both Madrid FC (Now Real Madrid) and Athletic Madrid (Now Atlético Madrid), and as a manager, he coached Real Madrid for six years from 1920 to 1926, but failed to win any trophies.

Club career
Born in Málaga, he moved to Madrid as a child where he began to play football in 1907. He joined the ranks of Club Español de Madrid in 1910, with whom he played sporadically for two seasons, featuring alongside the likes of José María Castell and Gómar. In 1912 he signed for Real Madrid, appearing as a goalkeeper for the reserve team, until his good performances led him to debut with the first team at the beginning of 1913. He alternated the position with Pablo Lemmel, then the team's goalkeeper. He helped the club to win two regional championships in 1912-13 and 1915–16. He remained there until 1916, when the club's board of directors decided that his low form did not allow him to continue defending Madrid's goal and so, he ended up in the neighboring club, Atlético Madrid.

International career
Like many other Madrid players of that time, he was summoned to play for the 'Centro' (Madrid area) representative team, and in May 1916, he was a member of the team that participated in the second edition of the Prince of Asturias Cup in 1916, an inter-regional competition organized by the RFEF. In the opening game against Catalonia he conceded 6 goals as Madrid lost 3–6 to their rivals, an event that not only prompted his dismissal from Real Madrid in that same year, it also cost him his place to the team's backup goalkeeper, Joaquín Pascual, who started in the second leg against Catalonia in a 2–2 draw. He was not a member of the Madrid team that won the 1917 Prince of Asturias Cup, but he started in both games of the 1918 edition, both ending in victories as Madrid won their second title in a row.

Managerial career
As a coach, he managed Real Madrid for six years from 1920 to 1926, but failed to win any trophies.

Honours

Club
Real Madrid
Campeonato Regional Centro:
Champions (2): 1912-13 and 1915–16

International
Madrid
Prince of Asturias Cup:
Champions (1): 1918
Runner-up (1): 1916

References

1892 births
Footballers from Madrid
Real Madrid CF players
Association football goalkeepers
Real Madrid CF managers
Spanish football managers
1962 deaths
Footballers from Málaga
Spanish footballers
Atlético Madrid footballers